Daphne Walker may refer to:

Daphne Walker (figure skater) (born c. 1925), British figure skater
Daphne Walker (singer) (born 1930), recording artist and singer from New Zealand